Gedney is a surname. Notable people with the surname include:

Bartholomew Gedney (c. 1640 – 1698/99), Salem witchcraft trials magistrate
Chris Gedney (born 1970), American football player
John B. Gedney (1809–1859), American politician
Nick Gedney, English darts player
Stephen Gedney, American electrical engineer
William Gedney, American photographer
William J. Gedney, historical linguist

See also
Gedney family, a family among the original settlers of Salem, Massachusetts